Cornelia Colda  (born ) is a retired Romanian volleyball player. She was part of the Romania women's national volleyball team.

She participated at the 1994 FIVB Volleyball Women's World Championship in Brazil. On club level she played with Dacia Pitesti.

Clubs
 Dacia Pitesti (1994)

References

1968 births
Living people
Romanian women's volleyball players
Place of birth missing (living people)